Tom Buckman (born Thomas Harry Buckman; March 7, 1947) is a former professional American football tight end.

Career
Buckman played with the Denver Broncos of the American Football League during the 1969 AFL season. He had also previously been drafted by the Green Bay Packers in the twelfth round of the 1969 NFL Draft.

He played at the collegiate level at Texas A&M University.

References

1947 births
Living people
Players of American football from Fort Worth, Texas
Denver Broncos (AFL) players
American football tight ends
Texas A&M Aggies football players